Army Creek is a  long river in northern Delaware in the United States that drains about . The stream is controlled by a floodgate just downstream of DE 9 that does not allow tidal influence of the stream.

The source of Army Creek is near the eastern edge of Bear, Delaware in the south and New Castle County Airport in the north.  The water then flows ENE to the Delaware River about  SW of New Castle, Delaware, at Dobbinsville.  Most of the watershed is urban/residential.

The watershed is the scene of two Superfund sites owing to the urban/industrial history.

See also
 List of Delaware rivers

References

External links 
Delaware Watersheds
Total Maximum Daily Loads (TMDLs) Analysis for the Watersheds of Army Creek, Delaware

Rivers of Maryland
Tributaries of the Delaware River